Hagenauer is a surname of German origin. It may refer to the following people:

 Friedrich Hagenauer (1829 — 1909), Australian missionary
 Joachim Hagenauer (born 1941), German information theorist
 Nikolaus Hagenauer (c. 1445/60 — 1538), German sculptor
 Johann Baptist von Hagenauer (1732 — 1811), Austrian sculptor
 Johann Lorenz von Hagenauer (1712 — 1792), Austrian merchant, landlord and friend of the Mozart family 
 Johann Georg von Hagenauer (1748 — 1835), Austrian architect
  Franz Hagenauer (1906 - 1986), Austrian sculptor
  Karl Hagenauer (1898 - 1956), Austrian designer

See also 
 Hagenau
Surnames of Austrian origin